William Westbrooke Richardson (died 23 July 1771) was High Sheriff of Sussex in 1770.

Early life
William Westbrooke Richardson was the son of Joseph Richardson (1689-1734), barrister, and his wife Elizabeth Minshull.

Career
In 1758 he was the owner of Mount Pleasant in East Barnet. Frederick Charles Cass wrote in his history of East Barnet that William Westbrooke Richardson was not connected with the Richardsons who owned the nearby Little Grove as far as he could tell.

He was elected a governor of Barnet Grammar School in 1759.

He was High Sheriff of Sussex in 1770.

Death and legacy
Richardson died on 23 July 1771. His trustees sold Mount Pleasant to Sir William Henry Ashhurst after Richardson's death.

See also
Heene

References 

High Sheriffs of Sussex
18th-century English people
Year of birth missing
1771 deaths
East Barnet
Cockfosters